Jaco Henn (born 17 December 1974 in Johannesburg) is a South African sport shooter. He competed in rifle shooting events at the Summer Olympics in 1996 and 2000.

Olympic results

References

1974 births
Living people
Sportspeople from Johannesburg
ISSF rifle shooters
South African male sport shooters
Olympic shooters of South Africa
Shooters at the 1996 Summer Olympics
Shooters at the 2000 Summer Olympics
Shooters at the 2002 Commonwealth Games
Commonwealth Games silver medallists for South Africa
Commonwealth Games bronze medallists for South Africa
Commonwealth Games medallists in shooting
20th-century South African people
Medallists at the 2002 Commonwealth Games